The College of William & Mary, located in Williamsburg, Virginia, United States, was founded in 1693 by a royal charter issued by King William III and Queen Mary II.  It is a public research university and has more than 94,000 living alumni.

Alumni of William & Mary have played important roles in shaping the United States. Three of the country's first ten presidents were educated there, one more than Harvard University's two. The school is also the alma mater of four United States Supreme Court justices (including its longest-serving chief justice, John Marshall).  Because the school was one of the few colleges existing in the Colonies, many colonial era notables enrolled including four signers of the Declaration of Independence and the first president of the Continental Congress, Peyton Randolph.

This list of alumni includes those who graduated, transferred to another school, dropped out, or were fully educated at the college but never received an academic degree.  This list uses the following notations:
 Year # – recipient of a William & Mary Bachelor of Arts, Bachelor of Science, or Bachelor of Business Administration degree
 Note: A question mark represents an unverifiable value for the digit it replaced. For instance, the "?" in "179?" means that no specific year can be found, but the general decade can be traced.
 Juris Doctor (J.D.) – recipient of a William & Mary Law School degree or the historical equivalent such as Doctor of Laws (LL.D.) or Bachelor of Civil Law (B.C.L.)
 Master of Business Administration (M.B.A.) – recipient of a Mason School of Business degree or the historical equivalent
 Master of Education (M.Ed.) – recipient of a Graduate School of Education degree or the historical equivalent
 Master of Arts (M.A.), Master of Science (M.S.) or Doctor of Philosophy (Ph.D.) – recipient of indicated degree from an Arts and Sciences graduate program or the historical equivalent

Federal government

Executive

President (Continental Congress)

Presidents (Constitution)

Cabinet

Ambassadors

Judiciary

United States Supreme Court

Other federal courts

Legislative

Representatives (Continental Congress)

Senators

Speakers of the House

Representatives

Other federal positions

State and local government

Governors

Virginia

Other states and territories

State legislators

Virginia

Other states and territories

State courts

Virginia Supreme Court
The Virginia Supreme Court has been known by other names since its creation.  Most recently, the Virginia Supreme Court was known as the Supreme Court of Appeals until 1970.  Regardless of name used, this sub-list is limited to members of the highest court of the state.  Other state judges can be found in the following sub-list dedicated to Other positions.

Other states' high courts

Other positions

Academia

College presidents and chancellors

Professors

Religion

Arts and media

Film

Music

Television

Writers

Other media

Military officers

Business and technology

Sciences

Sports 
The William & Mary Tribe sports teams have participated at Division I level in the NCAA since the school became a members in official conference competition in 1937, although pre-conference interscholastic competition started in 1893. College alumni have played in every major professional sports league in the United States except for the National Hockey League.

Baseball

Basketball

Football

Soccer

Other sports

Miscellaneous

Fictional people

References

External links
 William & Mary Digital Archive: A provisional list of alumni, grammar school students, members of the faculty, and members of the Board of Visitors, 1693–1888
 William & Mary Digital Archive: Catalogue of the Alumni and Alumnae For the Years 1866–1932

 
Lists of people by university or college in Virginia